Live in Paris may refer to:

Albums
Live in Paris (Art Ensemble of Chicago album)
Live in Paris (John Coltrane album)
Live in Paris (Jemeel Moondoc album)
Live in Paris 1975, an album by Deep Purple
Live in Paris+ (Jill Scott album)
Live in Paris (Diana Krall album) (2002)
Live in Paris 05, an album by Laura Pausini
Live in Paris (Psychic TV album)
Live in Paris (Seal album)
Live in Paris (Tom Rhodes album)
Live in Paris (Dee Dee Bridgewater album)
Live in Paris (EP)
Live in Paris (1975) (Lost ORTF Recordings) (Pharoah Sanders album)
Live in Paris '79

See also
 À Paris (disambiguation)
 Live from Paris (disambiguation)
Live in Paris Zenith '88, an album by Burning Spear
Live in Paris and Toronto, an album by Loreena McKennitt
Live in Paris & Ottawa 1968, an album by The Jimi Hendrix Experience